Whateley may refer to:

People and characters 
 Anne Whateley, said to have been William Shakespeare's fiancée
 Gerard Whateley, Australian sports commentator
Jason Whateley (born 1990), Australian boxer
 Leslie Whateley (1899–1987), British army officer, director of the Auxiliary Territorial Service during World War II
Mary Whateley (1738–1825), English poet and playwright
Oliver Whateley (1861–1926), English footballer
 William Whately (1583–1639), English Puritan cleric and author
 William Whateley (barrister) (1794–1862), English barrister
 characters of the H. P. Lovecraft novella "The Dunwich Horror"
Darren Whateley, from the British TV soap Coronation Street

Places and buildings
 Whateley, Warwickshire, a location in England
 Whateley Hall, a stately home (now demolished) on the edge of Castle Bromwich, Birmingham, UK, which was a rural village at the time

See also
 Whately (disambiguation)
 Whatley (disambiguation)
 Wheatley (disambiguation)